Union Station is a former train station in Seattle, Washington, United States, constructed between 1910 and 1911 to serve the Union Pacific Railroad and the Milwaukee Road. It was originally named Oregon and Washington Station, after a subsidiary line of the Union Pacific. It serves today as the headquarters of Sound Transit, the public transit agency serving the city and metro area.

History

Located at the corner of S. Jackson Street and 4th Avenue S. in the Pioneer Square neighborhood, the station opened on May 20, 1911. The Milwaukee Road discontinued passenger service to Union Station 50 years later, on May 22, 1961, and the Union Pacific followed suit on April 30, 1971. With no passenger rail service serving Seattle from Union Station, the building remained largely empty. An antique store filled the great hall for several years.  After nearly 30 years of sitting idle, the station finally experienced an expansive renovation supported by Nitze-Stagen with financial backing from Microsoft co-founder Paul Allen. The Union Station's renovation was the winner of the 2000 National Historic Preservation Award. The building has served as the headquarters of Sound Transit since 1999. Its grand hall is available to the public as a venue for weddings and other events.

In Seattle, the term Union Station refers not only to the main station building, but also to the
several adjacent office buildings at 505, 605, 625 and 705 5th Avenue South. Amazon.com was a major tenant of these properties from 2000 to 2011, all but one owned by Opus Northwest, and the other by Vulcan. The entire complex is earthquake-proofed by an underground ring of rubber.

The remaining passenger train service to Seattle (Amtrak long-distance trains and Sounder commuter trains) operates from King Street Station, located one block to the west of Union Station. The International District/Chinatown station of the Downtown Seattle Transit Tunnel, opened in 1990 and served by buses of King County Metro and since 2009 by Sound Transit's Central Link light rail line, is located directly adjacent to Union Station, mostly below street level.

It was used as the Teikoku train station in the pilot episode of The Man in the High Castle

References

Further reading

1910s architecture in the United States
1911 establishments in Washington (state)
Beaux-Arts architecture in Washington (state)
Seattle
National Register of Historic Places in Seattle
Pioneer Square, Seattle
Railway stations closed in 1971
Railway stations in Seattle
Railway stations on the National Register of Historic Places in Washington (state)
Railway stations in the United States opened in 1911
Seattle
Seattle